Siyahrud Rural District is in the Central District of Tehran County, Tehran province, Iran. At the National Census of 2006, its population was 16,837 in 4,881 households. There were 17,503 inhabitants in 5,142 households at the following census of 2011. At the most recent census of 2016, the population of the rural district was 5,578 in 1,446 households. The largest of its 21 villages was Mesgarabad, with 2,265 people.

References 

Tehran County

Rural Districts of Tehran Province

Populated places in Tehran Province

Populated places in Tehran County